The Millionairess is a 1960 British romantic comedy film directed by Anthony Asquith, and starring Sophia Loren and Peter Sellers. Set in London, it is a loose adaptation of George Bernard Shaw's 1936 play of the same name.

Plot
By the terms of her late father's will, spoiled London heiress Epifania Ognissanti di Parerga, the richest woman in the world, cannot marry unless her prospective husband is able to turn £500 into £15,000 within a three-month period. When Epifania becomes smitten with Alastair, a muscular tennis player, she rigs the contest by giving him £500 in stock and then buying it back for £15,000. Alastair is unable to live peacefully with the domineering Epifania, however, and is carrying on with the more domestic Polly Smith.

Contemplating suicide, Epifania melodramatically plunges into the Thames, and when Dr. Ahmed el Kabir, a self-effacing, selfless Indian physician who runs an inadequately equipped clinic for the poor, ignores her plight and paddles past in his rowboat, she swims to shore and accuses him of being an assassin. Julius Sagamore, the shrewd family solicitor, then suggests that Epifania undergo therapy with noted society psychiatrist Adrian Bland. The opportunist Bland makes a bid for her hand, but after he criticises her father, Epifania throws him into the Thames, and when Kabir rows out to help Bland, Epifania jumps in the river after him. Kabir takes her to a fishmonger's place to dry off. Attempting to ensnare him, Epifania feigns injury; the dedicated doctor remains impervious to her charms, indifferent to her wealth, even as they experience a definite 'connection' when he takes her wrist.

Determined to win the doctor, Epifania buys the property surrounding his clinic and then erects a new, modern facility. After Kabir rejects Epifania's offer to run the facility, she suggests that they marry instead. Intimidated by the headstrong heiress, Kabir manufactures a deathbed promise that he made to his mother, pledging that he would not marry unless his prospective bride can take 35 shillings and earn her own living for three months. Undaunted, Epifania accepts his challenge and then discloses the details of her father's will and hands him £500. When Kabir protests that he has no head for money, Epifania—knowing she will be able to again rig the situation—plops down the wad of bills and leaves.

Setting out to prove her worth, Epifania takes 35 shillings and heads for a sweatshop pasta factory. There, she threatens to expose the labour violations unless Joe, the proprietor, allows her to manage the plant. Three months later, Epifania has installed labour-saving machines, thus boosting productivity and making the plant a big success. Kabir, meanwhile, has tried in vain to give away his £500. After Kabir becomes drunk at a scientific dinner hosted by a wealthy doctor, he finds a sympathetic ear in his former professor and mentor, who offers to accept his money. At the clinic, Kabir eagerly turns over the cash to the professor. Soon after the professor leaves, Epifania appears and informs Kabir that she has met his mother's challenge. When he replies that he has failed and given all the money away, Epifania is deeply offended. Deciding to turn her back on the world of men, she announces that she plans to fire her board of directors, disband her empire and retire to a Tibetan monastery once she has evicted all the monks.

Desperate to keep his job, Sagamore realises that Kabir is responsible for Epifania's erratic behaviour and goes to see the doctor. At the clinic, Sagamore tells Kabir that Epifania has vowed to withdraw from the world at the stroke of midnight. Concerned that this means she is seriously considering suicide, Kabir hurries to the reception where Epifania is to bid farewell to her previous existence. Certain that their marriage is now imminent, Sagamore meets the terms of the will by purchasing Kabir's medical papers for £15,000. After Kabir rushes to Epifania, they kiss and he finally expresses his love.

Cast

 Sophia Loren as Epifania Parerga 
 Peter Sellers as Dr. Ahmed el Kabir
 Alastair Sim as Julius Sagamore
 Vittorio De Sica as Joe
 Dennis Price as Dr. Adrian Bland
 Gary Raymond as Alastair Fitzfassenden 
 Alfie Bass as Fish Curer
 Miriam Karlin as Mrs. Joe
 Noel Purcell as Professor Merton
 Virginia Vernon as Polly
 Graham Stark as Butler
 Diana Coupland as Nurse
 Pauline Jameson as Muriel Pilkington
 Eleanor Summerfield as Mrs. Willoughby
 Willoughby Goddard as President
 Basil Hoskins as 1st Secretary
 Gordon Sterne as 2nd Secretary
 Tempe Adam as Gloria
 Wally Patch as Tubby Isaacs, Whelk Seller
 Charles Hill as Corelli
 Ray Austin as Stunt double for Dennis Price

Reception
The film was one of the most popular movies at the British box office in 1960.  

In the United States and Canada, the film Rentals .

Hit song
George Martin, who was the producer at that time of Peter Sellers' comedy recordings, conceived and instigated the writing and recording of a comedy duet "Goodness Gracious Me", sung by Sellers and Loren in their film characters. Martin commissioned David Lee and Herbert Kretzmer to write the song. Martin himself produced the recording. Martin envisioned the song as a recording to be incorporated in the soundtrack of the film. The film's producers did not agree to this, but the studio was happy to see the song released as a stand-alone single to promote the film. The song became a UK chart hit in 1960 and succeeded in publicising the film.

References

External links
 
 

1960 films
1960 romantic comedy films
British romantic comedy films
British films based on plays
Films based on works by George Bernard Shaw
Films set in London
20th Century Fox films
CinemaScope films
Films directed by Anthony Asquith
Films produced by Dimitri de Grunwald
Films with screenplays by Wolf Mankowitz
Films shot at MGM-British Studios
1960s English-language films
1960s British films